Portrait of Cardinal Richelieu is a portrait painting by the Flemish-born French painter Philippe de Champaigne, Richelieu's favourite portraitist. It was painted a few months before the cardinal's death and is now in the Musée des Beaux-Arts of Strasbourg, France. Its inventory number is 987–2–1. 

The painting originally consisted of at least two portraits of Richelieu: right profile and frontal. The frontal portrait was cut off at some point and lost; X-ray examinations of the painting have revealed that it has once existed and that the remaining trace has been concealed by an added border. Conversely, it is not established if a left profile portrait on the same canvas had once existed as well. The Strasbourg version (as a double or maybe triple portrait) then served as the basis for the Triple Portrait of Cardinal de Richelieu, which was mostly painted by Champaigne's workshop, and is considered artistically inferior. The Triple Portrait was in turn used as a model for a bust.

References

External links

Portrait du cardinal de Richelieu , presentation on the museum's website

1642 paintings
Paintings by Philippe de Champaigne
Paintings in the collection of the Musée des Beaux-Arts de Strasbourg
Oil on canvas paintings
Baroque paintings
17th-century portraits
Cardinal Richelieu